Baraka also called "bala'a" is a town in the eastern Congolese province of South Kivu, on Lake Tanganyika. This is the main town of the Fizi Territory. Its population in late 2014 was around 120,000 and predominantly Swahili and  Ebembe speaking. Other estimates give 90,000. The name of the city means "blessing" in Swahili.

In the 1960s, the city was at the center of cross-border Maoist insurgency started by Laurent-Désiré Kabila. It continued well until the 1980s. The population of the city considerably decreased during the Civil war in the Democratic Republic of the Congo, during which the city was under control of the Rwanda-backed Rally for Congolese Democracy. After the end of the war, people started to return and take jobs, mainly in the trade.

In 2014, the city drew attention as a pilot project for the Missing Maps project.

As of 2015, in Baraka there were no paved roads, no running water, and no electricity.

In October 2021 MONUSCO opened a base nearby that allowed 7,000 people to return. In February 2022 they created a temporary base north of Baraka to deal with Mai-Mai attacks.

References

Populated places in South Kivu
Populated places on Lake Tanganyika